The eighth season of One Tree Hill, an American television series, premiered on September 14, 2010. After successful ratings for the early episodes of the season on The CW, the network ordered a back-order of nine episodes, bringing the total episode count to twenty-two.

Season eight features the return of the original opening credits and the original opening theme song "I Don't Want to Be" covered by various artists each week, while the original version is featured sporadically. Schwahn wrote 13 out of the 22 episodes, including the final six episodes of the season.

The season opened to a 1.1 Adults 18–49 rating and 2.14 million viewers. The thirteenth episode of the season, "The Other Half of Me" which saw Brooke getting married achieved season highs in all categories with a 1.2 Adults 18–49 rating, a 2.4 in Women 18–34 and 2.42 million viewers making it the most watched episode since December 2009. The season averaged 1.8 million viewers. It was released on DVD in the UK on October 29, 2011.

Overview
Brooke and Julian are engaged but she has to deal with financial problems at Clothes Over Bros, thanks to Victoria. Nathan makes a huge decision regarding his career. Haley finds out she is pregnant again, this time with a girl. Clay and Quinn's lives hang in the balance when they are left for dead after Katie shoots the both of them. A new love triangle starts between Chase, Alex, and Mia. Mouth tries to get close to Millicent once more. Meanwhile, Quinn runs into someone she least expects on the outskirts of town, and starts a pen pal relationship with them.

Cast and characters

Regular
 James Lafferty as Nathan Scott (22 episodes)
 Bethany Joy Galeotti as Haley James Scott (22 episodes)
 Sophia Bush as Brooke Davis (22 episodes)
 Austin Nichols as Julian Baker (22 episodes)
 Robert Buckley as Clay Evans (20 episodes)
 Shantel VanSanten as Quinn James (20 episodes)
 Jackson Brundage as Jamie Scott (18 episodes)
 Lee Norris as Mouth McFadden (14 episodes)
 Jana Kramer as Alex Dupre (16 episodes)
 Lisa Goldstein as Millicent Huxtable (16 episodes)
 Stephen Colletti as Chase Adams (18 episodes)

Recurring
 Kate Voegele as Mia Catalano (11 episodes)
Michael May as Chuck Scolnik (10 episodes)
 Daphne Zuniga as Victoria Davis (9 episodes)
Katherine Landry as Madison (8 episodes)
 Antwon Tanner as Skills Taylor (6 episodes)
 Laura Izibor as Erin Macree (6 episodes)
 Peter Riegert as Dr. August Kellerman (6 episodes)
 Sharon Lawrence as Sylvia Baker (6 episodes)
Eric McIntire as Ian Kellerman (5 episodes)
 Leven Rambin as Chloe Hall (5 episodes)
 Allison Munn as Lauren (3 episodes)
 Amanda Schull as Katie Ryan (3 episodes)
 Cullen Moss as Junk Moretti (3 episodes)
Kelley Davis as Mrs. Scolnik (3 episodes)
 Gregory Harrison as Paul Norris (1 episode)
 Vaughn Wilson as Fergie Thompson (1 episode)
Bradley Evans as Jerry (1 episode)

Special Guest Star
 Paul Johansson as Dan Scott (2 episodes)

Episodes

Production

The series was officially renewed for en eighth season on May 20, 2010. It was also announced the show would move to Tuesday's at 8:00 p.m. Eastern/7:00 p.m. Central, as a lead-in to Life Unexpected. The season premiered on September 14, 2010. Entertainment Weekly first reported that there would be a crossover event with Life Unexpected. In the crossover, Haley and Mia traveled to Portland (where Life Unexpected is set) to sing in a music festival hosted by Cate's radio station. Haley and Cate met and were "surprised to learn that they share a similar back story [as] mothers." The CW was hoping that the crossover event would make One Tree Hill's viewers want to check out Life Unexpected. The episode aired October 12.

The original theme song of the show, "I Don't Want to Be" by Gavin DeGraw and original credit format will return for this season. Mark Schwahn has decided to introduce a new style of the theme song every week by selecting different artists to perform it such as Kate Voegele and members of Fall Out Boy. This will be the first season in 3 years to feature the opening credits.

On September 23, The CW ordered an additional 6 scripts for One Tree Hill, with its production order still at 13. On October 22, 2010, the show was picked up for a full-season, which will total at 22 episodes.

Cast

At the beginning of the season, Mark Schwahn said "there are a lot of people we'd like to bring back," specifically Paul Johansson and Danneel Harris. Sophia Bush also revealed that she would like to see Harris return. Sharon Lawrence signed on for a multi-episode arc to play Julian's mother who comes to Tree Hill to help plan Brooke and Julian's wedding. She has been described as a "monster-in-law". Laura Izibor also joined the cast as a musician in the same capacity as Kate Voegele. Kid Cudi will guest star in one episode for a concert Haley hosts at TRIC. Dave Navarro will also guest star as himself.

E! Online confirmed that there are plans for Chad Michael Murray and Hilarie Burton to return to the series in Season 8. Schwahn has said that the actors busy schedules may prevent a return in time for Brooke's wedding, but hopes they can return later in the season. On December 7, 2010, Kristin Dos Santos reported that Murray and Burton would definitely not be back for Brooke's wedding, but they are still expected to return. However, in a January 2011 interview, Hilarie Burton stated that she will not be returning to the show due to her busy schedule. Despite rumors to the contrary, Bethany Joy Galeotti has said she will be with the series until the end. Paul Johansson reprised his role as Dan Scott for one episode. Stephen Colletti was upgraded to series regular status from episode 14, after appearing in a recurring capacity since season four.

Movieline reported that The Blind Side actor Quinton Aaron would appear in the 14th episode of the season. He played Tommy, a student in Nathan's business class, whom he formed a bond with. Leven Rambin of Grey's Anatomy began a recurring role in episode 16. She played a young woman that Brooke crossed paths with as she explored adoption options. Mark Schwahn confirmed that Chad Michael Murray and Hilarie Burton would definitely not be in the final few episodes of season 8. He said on the matter, "Quite frankly, we just couldn’t make a deal."

Story

Before season eight began, Mark Schwahn said there would be fewer crazy storylines and the show would return to its roots focusing on the core group of regulars and some guest stars, rather than the 30 or so from season 7. He was also hopeful for a Lucas and Peyton return for Brooke's wedding and the birth of Haley's baby. He has also mentioned the new love triangle he was developing, "Alex (Jana Kramer) has moved on to a new guy and a new triangle. She took a liking to Chase (Stephen Colletti) after he and Mia (Kate Voegele) broke up, but in the final episode, Mia made it clear via text that she regretted the decision to end it with him. This season, viewers will see who Chase really wants to be with. The Chase-Alex-Mia situation is front and center at the beginning of the season."

Brooke Davis is happier than ever; preparing to marry Julian Baker. Nathan prepares for his second season in the NBA; The Scott family are expecting their second child and Haley feels the baby will be a girl. Also, Quinn and Clay's lives hang in the balance. Robert Buckley has said Clay will be suffering from a chest wound. Both Clay and Quinn were later released and struggle with life back at the beach house. Entertainment Weekly reported that Victoria and Millicent will jeopardize the future of Brooke's company. They began lying to investors about Clothes Over Bro's finances to fund the men's line, causing Brooke to be arrested. She later made the decision to give up the company and her personal fortune in order to pay back investors in full, causing a new rift between her and Victoria as Victoria only went to prison so Brooke could keep her company.

Nathan abandoned basketball after finding out his back was getting worse. Quinn goes after Katie Ryan when she returns to Tree Hill from a photography trip to Africa, where she had detoured to track Katie down.

A major hurricane struck Tree Hill, leaving Brooke and Jamie's life in danger.

Reception
The season opened to a 1.1 adults 18–49 rating and 2.14 million viewers. The thirteenth episode of the season, "The Other Half of Me" which saw Brooke get married achieved season highs in all categories with a 1.2 adults 18–49 rating, a 2.4 in women 18–34 and 2.42 million viewers making it the most watched episode since December, 2009. The twentieth episode of the season hit series lows in viewers (1.24m) and in Adults 18–49 (0.6). The season averaged 1.76 million live viewers and a 0.9 rating in adults 18–49. With live+7 day DVR viewing factored in, the season averaged 2.13 million viewers and a 1.1 rating.

DVD release
The DVD release of season eight was released nearly 5 months after the season had completed broadcast on television. It has been released in Region 1 and Region 2 and Region 4. As well as every episode from the season, the DVD release features bonus material such as audio commentaries on some episodes from the creator and cast, deleted scenes, gag reels and behind-the-scenes featurettes.

References

One Tree Hill (TV series) seasons

2010 American television seasons
2011 American television seasons